Ankiti Bose (born 1992) is a co-founder of e-commerce start-up Zilingo. She has been featured in Forbes Asia 30 Under 30 list in 2018 as well as in Fortune's 40 Under 40 along with Bloomberg 50 in 2019. On 31 March 2022, she was suspended as CEO after an attempt to raise capital raised questions about Zilingo's accounting practices, according to Bloomberg. On 20 May 2022 Bose was fired from Zilingo.

Early life and education 
Bose is from India. She completed her schooling from Cambridge School, Kandivli, Mumbai. She studied mathematics and economics at St. Xavier's College, Mumbai.

Career 
Bose started her career working at McKinsey & Company and Sequoia Capital in Bangalore. After a trip to the Chatuchak Weekend Market Bose noticed that fashion markets in Southeast Asia had immense room for penetration and growth. The market includes over 11,000 independent merchants lacking an online presence. Whilst there was investment in improving access to the internet, Bose recognized that retailers were not trained in financing, scaling-up, website design, and procurement nor well equipped to compete with large global players.

In 2015, Bose left her position as an investment analyst at Sequoia Capital to launch her own company, Zilingo. Bose was twenty three when she founded Zilingo. She moved to Singapore in 2016, where she developed the software and supply chain solutions.

In 2019, Zilingo raised $226 million in Series D fundraising, resulting in a $970 million market value. As of 2019, it had over seven million active users leveraging the global platform.

The China–United States trade war resulted in United States retailers leaving China, which allowed Zilingo to expand into America. She has worked to source Indian fabrics for Californian factories as well as opening offices on the West Coast and East Coast. At Zilingo, Bose supported a program to train women in Indonesia to create clothing, recognising that in Indonesia almost 40% of women leave the workforce after they get married. Zilingo set up a coaching programme to support leaders across the company.

In March 2022, Bose was suspended from Zilingo with allegations of financial misrepresentation and mismanagement pending an investigation. Among other allegations, shareholders questioned her S$50,000 per month salary which according to her contract five years ago was S$8,500. Her management style of using intimidation to extract compliance in her daily working in Zilingo was also called into question.  

Bose has spoken at the World Economic Forum in India.

Awards and honours 

2018: Named in Forbes 30 Under 30 - Asia - Big Money
2019: Fortune magazine's 40 Under 40
2019: The Bloomberg 50
2019: Business Worldwide Magazine Most Innovative CEO of the Year – Singapore
2020: featured in Singapore 100 Women in Tech List

References 

1992 births
Living people
St. Xavier's College, Mumbai alumni
Indian women business executives
Women chief executives